Jonas Michel Dirkner (born 15 July 2002) is a German professional footballer who plays as a midfielder for VSG Altglienicke.

Career
Dirkner joined Hertha BSC at under-15 level after playing for Hansa Rostock.

References

External links
 
 
 
 

2002 births
Living people
Sportspeople from Rostock
Footballers from Mecklenburg-Western Pomerania
German footballers
Germany youth international footballers
Association football midfielders
FC Hansa Rostock players
Hertha BSC II players
Hertha BSC players
VSG Altglienicke players
Bundesliga players
Regionalliga players